ecobee is a Canadian home automation company that makes smart thermostats, temperature and occupancy sensors, smart light switches, smart cameras, and contact sensors.

The thermostats are controlled by using the built-in touchscreen, web portal, or app available for iOS, Android, and the Apple Watch. Other devices are controlled solely through the app or web portal.

The thermostat or camera acts as a hub for their other devices. The light switches do not require a thermostat or camera but do not provide hub functionality.

Additionally, ecobee provides a set of subscription services to complement its product line.

History 

ecobee was founded in 2007.  It has been recognized with a number of awards, including the Deloitte Technology Green 15 Award for Canadian green technology companies, and the 2011 AHR Expo Innovation Award in the category of building automation.

In March 2018, ecobee raised a CA$80 million series C round of funding.

In November 2021, ecobee announced that it would be acquired by Generac Holdings for $770 million. The sale closed the following month.

Products

Smart Thermostats 

ecobee created the world's first smart thermostat, the ecobee Smart, in 2008. Since then, they have gradually updated their thermostat lineup over the years up to the most recent release of the flagship ecobee SmartThermostat in June 2019. Additionally, they continue to sell the ecobee3 lite as a less expensive, non-Alexa enabled smart thermostat that does not ship with any remote sensors but still includes support for them.

The thermostats incorporate a touchscreen and work with up to 32 remote temperature/occupancy sensors which can adjust the temperature based on where you are. The ecobee4 and ecobee SmartThermostat also include Amazon Alexa support.

All thermostats since the ecobee3 allow the user to set different schedules each day for various activities (called comfort settings). By default these include home, away, and sleep. Custom comfort settings can also be created. The remote temperature/occupancy sensors can engage a Smart Away mode if no movement is detected or a Follow Me mode to selectively control the thermostat based on where people are within the home. All remote sensors which are designated as "participating" in a comfort setting take the average of their temperatures and use that as the building's "overall" temperature. A vacation mode is provided which allows users to set a temperature range that the thermostat should maintain between specified dates (for extended times away from home). Additionally, users can set convenient reminders for HVAC maintenance, furnace filter replacement, or UV Lamp replacement, as well as alerts for high/low temperature and high/low humidity.

Room Sensors 
The remote sensors can connect to an ecobee thermostat to provide temperature and occupancy information or an ecobee camera to provide occupancy information for the home monitoring service.

eco+ 
ecobee began rolling out eco+ in 2019 to personalize individual thermostats to the home's environment.

Most notably, this includes the ability to connect your utility company to your thermostat. Using this information it can heat/cool the home depending on current and upcoming time-of-use rate changes, or allow the home to participate in demand-response events.

Smart Light Switch 

The ecobee Switch+ is a smart light switch announced in May 2017 and released on March 26, 2018. The Switch+ has a microphone with built-in Amazon Alexa, along with occupancy and daylight sensors.

SmartCamera 

The ecobee SmartCamera is a smart camera released on April 15, 2020. It features 1080p video, a 180 degree field of view, auto pan-tilt, Amazon Alexa support, two-way talk, and night-vision.

Contact Sensor 
The ecobee SmartSensor contact sensors were released on April 15, 2020 alongside the SmartCamera to complement the Haven home monitoring system.

Similar to the Room Sensors, they connect to a hub device (thermostat or camera) wirelessly.

Subscriptions

Smart Security 
ecobee Smart Security provides a subscription-based self-monitoring home monitoring system which integrates the sensors in all of its products into a home security system.

Air Filters 
ecobee Air Filters automatically sends the user furnace filters when their current filter must be replaced.

Integrations 

ecobee products integrate with: Microsoft's Cortana, Amazon Alexa, Apple HomeKit, Google Assistant, Samsung SmartThings, Hubitat, Wink, Haiku Fans, IFTTT, Logitech Harmony, Vera, and Control4.

ecobee uses an open API for additional integration options.

References

External links 
 Official Website

Home automation companies
Manufacturing companies based in Toronto
Sustainable energy
Heating, ventilation, and air conditioning companies
IOS software
WatchOS software
Android (operating system) software
Canadian brands